William Johnson Stone (June 26, 1841 – March 12, 1923)  was a US Representative from Kentucky.

Biography
He was born in Kuttawa, Caldwell (now Lyon) County, Kentucky on June 26, 1841. He attended the common schools and Q.M. Tyler's Collegiate Institute in Cadiz, Trigg County. Stone studied law. During the American Civil War he served as captain in the Confederate Army. After the war he engaged in agricultural pursuits. He was a member of the Kentucky House of Representatives in 1867, 1875, and 1883, serving as speaker in 1875.

He was elected as a Democrat to the Forty-ninth and to the four succeeding Congresses (March 4, 1885 – March 3, 1895): chairman, Committee on War Claims (Fiftieth Congress) He engaged in mercantile pursuits in Kuttawa, Lyon County; Confederate pension commissioner of Kentucky in 1912 and served until his death in Frankfort, Kentucky, March 12, 1923; interment in New Bethel Cemetery, Lyon County, Kentucky.

Throughout his political career, Stone was a vocal advocate for Confederate veterans, testifying on behalf of their right to receive pensions and ultimately winning his case.

References

External links

1841 births
1923 deaths
People from Lyon County, Kentucky
Confederate States Army officers
Speakers of the Kentucky House of Representatives
Democratic Party members of the United States House of Representatives from Kentucky